John Reynolds Hughes (February 11, 1855 – June 3, 1947) was a Texas Ranger and cowboy of the Old West, and later an author. Several books were written about his long history as one of the most influential Texas Rangers of all time.  It has been suggested he was the inspiration for the Lone Ranger character, since Zane Grey dedicated The Lone Star Ranger to Hughes in 1915. The ambush of Texas Ranger Captain Frank Jones and Hughes' long hunt for the killers also support this theory. Hughes also told relatives that he believed he was the inspiration for the Lone Ranger character.

Early life
Hughes was born John Reynolds Hughes, in Cambridge, Illinois, son to Thomas Hughes and Jennie Bond Hughes. In 1865 the family moved to Dixon, Illinois, then later to Mound City, Kansas. Hughes left home at the age of 14 to work on a ranch as a cowboy. He later made his way west into Indian Territory, where he became closely associated with the Choctaw and Osage Indians, and later with the Comanche, learning much about their cultures and traditions. Following this, Hughes worked as a trail driver on the Chisholm Trail, then purchased a farm in Liberty Hill, Texas.

Joining the Texas Rangers

In May 1886, his neighbor lost several horses to thieves, and Hughes pursued the band, killing two of the men in the process, and capturing the remaining thieves in New Mexico Territory, returning the horses to his neighbor. The pursuit lasted for several months, and brought him to the attention of local Texas Ranger Ira Aten. In July, 1887, Hughes accompanied Ranger Aten in the pursuit of murderer Judd Roberts, with Hughes and Aten killing Roberts in a gunfight. Recruited by the Rangers, prompted by Aten's recommendation, Hughes signed on in 1887 beginning a career that would last until his retirement on January 31, 1915.

He served mainly in what was referred to as the "Frontier Battalion", on the Mexico–American border. During that time he gained a reputation as a relentless pursuer of outlaws, and in 1890, while in Shafter, Texas, Hughes posed with fellow Rangers Bob Speaks, Alonzo "Lon" Oden, and Jim Putnam in one of the most widely circulated Texas Ranger photos in history. The photo has been since used in numerous magazines, and on postcards, in addition to being placed on T-shirts in the latter 20th century. At the time of the photo, the Rangers, part of "D Company", "Frontier Battalion", were assigned to protect a silver mine located in Shafter. Hughes was promoted to captain in 1893, then later to senior captain.

Following the 1893 murder of Texas Ranger Captain Frank Jones, killed during an ambush by bandits, Hughes led a company of Rangers in a hunt for the killers, most of whom were members of the Olguin family. Since the Rangers led by Captain Jones had mistakenly entered into Mexico, and were across the border with Mexico when the shootout took place, no suspects would be prosecuted. The bandits were wanted for numerous crimes committed inside the U.S., which had led Captain Jones in pursuit of them. Based on a list of names supplied by early Ranger undercover agent Ernest St. Leon, Hughes and his company tracked down 18 suspects in the murder, and either killed them all in shootouts or by way of hanging, effectively ending the Olguin family's crime spree.
  
Hughes had a reputation that preceded him. Even notorious outlaws like Jim Miller preferred not to cross his path. The sheriff of Pecos, Texas (Bud) Frazer, had reason to believe that Jim Miller and his gang were planning to kill him when he got back to Pecos from a business trip. In order to ensure his safety, he asked for the help of John R. Hughes. What happened next is chronicled in Leon Claire Metz book, The Shooters.
"Nobody in Pecos, of course, wanted to tangle with Hughes, and a few minutes after the ranger hit town Miller was in jail charged with plotting to commit murder."

After retirement
Following his retirement, western novelist Zane Grey authored The Lone Star Ranger, dedicated to Hughes and his company of Rangers.  A close friend of Hughes named Jack Martin went on to author The Border Boss, in 1942 telling of his exploits while with the Rangers. Author W. W. Sterling made Hughes the subject of his book, Trails and Trials of a Texas Ranger, and in addition to those Hughes was included in the books Encyclopedia of Western Gunfighters by Bill O'Neal, and The Law Comes to Texas by Frederick Wilkins. Hughes spent the next several years traveling, ranching and prospecting, before settling in Austin, Texas, where he became the chairman of the board and largest stockholder for Citizens Industrial Bank.

In 1940 he was selected for the Certificate of Valor, a national award that recognized law enforcement officers. Hughes had never married, and by the 1940s Hughes was in poor health, and most of those closest to him had long since died. Depressed and alone, he moved in with a niece in Austin. On June 3, 1947, he died by suicide at the age of 92. He is buried in the State Cemetery. Hughes is a member of the Texas Rangers Hall of Fame.

See also
Battle of Tres Jacales

References

External links
Captain John Reynolds Hughes
The Story behind The Photograph
Texas Online, John Hughes, Texas Ranger
Texas Ranger Hall of Fame, John R. Hughes

Members of the Texas Ranger Division
Lawmen of the American Old West
Cowboys
People from Cambridge, Illinois
People from Dixon, Illinois
People from Mound City, Kansas
1855 births
1947 deaths
People from Liberty Hill, Texas